A Dreamers Christmas is an album of Christmas music by John Zorn released in October 2011 on the Tzadik label. It was produced by John Zorn and released on his own label Tzadik Records. It was Zorn's 5th album in 2011.

Reception

Allmusic said  "A Dreamer's Christmas is one of those holiday records -- once you hear it, you'll be reaching for it every season." Consequence of Sound called it "interesting, captivating, and pleasing for every member of the family at your holiday party."

Track listing

Personnel
Marc Ribot − guitars
Jamie Saft − keyboards
Kenny Wollesen − vibes, chimes, glockenspiel
Trevor Dunn − bass guitar, double bass
Joey Baron − drums
Cyro Baptista − percussion
Mike Patton − vocal

References

The Dreamers albums
Albums produced by John Zorn
Christmas albums by American artists
2011 Christmas albums
Tzadik Records albums
Jazz Christmas albums